Metrocable is a gondola lift system implemented by the City Council of Medellín, Colombia, with the purpose of providing a transportation service that complements the Medellín Metro. It was designed to reach some of the city's informal settlements on the steep hills that mark its topography. It is largely considered to be the first urban cable propelled transit system in South America.
The transportation infrastructure is already established and has been in service since 2004.

The system consists of a network of 16 pre-existing gondolas.

However, in these systems the passengers ride through windows attached to the inside of the gondola, and therefore do not have to interact with others. There were plans in the city for some decades before its inception for some form of transportation that took account of the difficult topography of the region. In its modern incarnation, it was the result of a joint effort between the city's elected mayor, Luis Pérez Gutiérrez, and the Metro Company. For some, the initial conception of this system was indirectly inspired by the Caracas Aerial Tramway (also known as the Mount Avila Gondola) which was designed primarily to carry passengers to a luxury hotel in the 1950s.

Line K of the Metrocable connecting the Medellín River valley to the steep hills in Comunas (districts) 1 and 2, was the first system in the world dedicated to public transport, with a fixed service schedule. Since starting operations in 2004, it carries 30,000 people daily and is operationally integrated into the rest of Medellín's mass transit system (SITVA), which includes the overground Metro, bus rapid transit system (BRT) and a tramway line (opened in 2016).

As of 2020, the Medellín Metrocable system has five lines, namely Line H, Line K, Line J, Line L (Cable Arvi) and Line M. Overall, the system has been received with enthusiasm by the locals, who are mainly low-income users and are prepared to queue for up to 45 minutes at peak times to use it. There is a rapidly growing number of similar systems in cities in Latin America (Metrocable (Caracas), Mi Teleférico (La Paz), Manizales, Cali, TransMiCable (Bogotá), Mexicable near Mexico City, among others) and elsewhere.

Description
Medellín is located in the Aburrá Valley and is surrounded by hills. Many of those hills are home to underdeveloped barrios (asentamientos informales), which due to their location cannot be reached by Medellín's biggest mass transportation system Metro. Many of these barrios are in fact located in very steep grounds to the extent that not even a regular bus system could be either useful or commercially profitable. Before the implementation of the Metrocable Line K, residents of the Santo Domingo Savio barrio spent upwards of 2 hours commuting to work each way.

The Metrocable system is a branch of Medellín's metro and it is managed by the corporation Metro of Medellín. The system uses Monocable Detachable Gondola technology which consists of cable cars connected to a fixed cable through means of a detachable grip.

The system was built by the French company Poma.

Routes

As of 2020, five Metrocable lines have been opened -Line H, Line J, Line K, Line L and Line M- and one is under construction (Line P).

Line K

Line K was the initial line that was built and was first opened in 2004. It has a length of 2.07 km and contains the following four stations: Acevedo, Andalucia, Popular, and Santo Domingo. Construction costs are estimated at $26 million USD.

Line J

Soon after officials saw the enormous success of Line K, plans to proceed with another line - Line J - was immediately on the table. It officially opened in 2008. Similar to Line K, it also has four stations: San Javier, Juan XXIII, Vallejuelos and La Aurora. The entire length of Line J runs along 2.7 km of cable.

Line L
Line L does not serve communal areas, rather, it is a tourist-oriented line which is connected to Arví Park and is part of a social project to bring retreats and nature to the masses. Passengers must pay an extra fare - 12,500 Colombian Pesos ($2.50 USD approx.) one way to ride this line.

It is connected to Line K's terminus station - Santo Domingo. It is also expected that this new line will help promote and develop tourism in the rural areas around Lake Guarne. It will take 14 minutes to ascend to El Tambo and there will be no intermediate stations.

Line H

Line H was opened in 2016. It has a length of 1.4 km and includes three stations: Oriente, Las Torres and Villa Sierra. The demand is estimated at 1,800 passengers per hour (compared with 3,000 for Line K). In Oriente station, it connects to the Ayacucho Tram line, which in turns is connected to Line A of the overground metro system.

Line M

Line M was opened in 2019. It has a length of 1.05 km and includes three stations: Miraflores, El Pinal and Trece de Noviembre. It has a capacity of 2,500 passengers per hour and in Miraflores station, it connects to the Ayacucho Tram line, which in turns is connected to Line A of the overground metro system.

Line P
Line P, which extends west from Acevedo station, was inaugurated Jun 10 2021.

Public transit

Aerial lifts are not often used as a mass transportation system, although they can be used as such. However, they are becoming more popular with examples which include the Metrocable system in Caracas, Venezuela, the Mexicable system in Ecatepec, Mexico, the Mi Teleférico system in La Paz, Bolivia, the Teleférico do Alemão in Rio de Janeiro, Brazil (currently closed), and, in the United States, the Roosevelt Island Tramway in New York City  and the Portland Aerial Tram in Portland, Oregon.

While gondolas used as transit offer many advantages such as the ability of build on terrain that precludes other surface transportations, cost-effectiveness, low emissions and energy efficiency, one of the disadvantages of gondolas is the risk of power outages. In case of a hazard or an emergency it is not possible to exit the cabins. However, Medellín Metro is ameliorating this problem by providing a communication system in every vehicle should an emergency occur.

Studies have suggested strong correlations between the intervention of the Metrocables and dramatic reductions in crime associated with the areas where Medellín Metrocable has been introduced.

References

See also 

Medellín Metro
Metrocable (Caracas)
Aerovia (Guayaquil)

Aerial tramways in Colombia
Vertical transport devices
Medellín
Transport infrastructure completed in 2004
2004 establishments in Colombia